The Punjab State Human Rights Commission (PSHRC) of Punjab, India is a Statutory public body constituted on 17 March 1997. It was given a statutory basis by the Protection of Human Rights Act, 1993 (PHRA). The PSHRC is the State Human Rights Commission of Punjab, responsible for the protection and promotion of human rights, defined by the Act as "Rights Relating To Life, liberty, equality and dignity of the individual guaranteed by the Constitution or embodied in the International Covenants and enforceable by courts in India."

Background
The decision to set up Punjab State Human Rights Commission was taken vide notification by State Government on 17 March 1997 under the Protection of Human Rights Act 1993 No.10 of 1994 to protect the Rights of Human as granted by Constitution of India. The Commission started functioning on 16th July 1997.

List of Chairpersons

References 

Government of Punjab, India
Human rights  in India
1997 establishments in Punjab, India